William Alatalo (born 19 April 2002) is a Finnish-Ethiopian racing driver from Ilmajoki who most recently raced for Jenzer Motorsport in the FIA Formula 3 Championship.

Career

Karting 
Alatalo started karting in 2009. He had a successful karting career winning the Finnish championship in Cadet (2010), Raket (2014) and OKJ classes (2016).

Formula STCC Nordic 
In 2017, Alatalo made his single-seater debut in Formula STCC Nordic with Kart In Club Driving Academy. Alatalo won one race at Anderstorp and finished the season 5th with 142 points.

Italian F4 Championship 
Alatalo moved to the Italian F4 Championship for 2018 where he spent two years driving for Mücke Motorsport. The two seasons in Italy netted him one win and another podium finish in 42 races.

Formula Renault Eurocup 
In 2020 Alatalo contested the Formula Renault Eurocup driving for JD Motorsport. He achieved two podiums and a pole position during the season and finished 8th in the standings with 92 points.

Formula Regional European Championship

2021 

The following year, Alatalo moved to Arden Motorsport, partnering Alex Quinn and Nicola Marinangeli in the Formula Regional European Championship. His campaign proved to be consistent, with Alatalo finishing every race and being outside of the top ten on only seven occasions. The Finn's best result would end up being a third place at the Circuit Paul Ricard, and he finished the season in eleventh place, two positions behind Quinn.

2022 
Alatalo was called up to replace Santiago Ramos at the season finale in Mugello with KIC Motorsport, a month after the final round of Alatalo's F3 season.

FIA Formula 3 Championship 

In 2022 Alatalo made the step-up to the FIA Formula 3 Championship with Jenzer Motorsport, having taken part in a number of test days with the Swiss team in the winter. Upon the announcement of his signing, Alatalo commented that this move brought him "one step closer to [his] dream". He managed to score a points in the first feature race at Bahrain, and followed that up with another point in the next feature race in Imola, benefiting from a penalty for Ollie Bearman. The Finnish driver then went on a points-scoring drought lasting five races, until he managed to collect four points in tricky weather conditions at the Red Bull Ring. Two point-less races in Budapest would come before a fruitful weekend at Spa: there, Alatalo took points in both races, ending up sixth on Saturday and seventh in the feature race. Despite this, a mistake at the restart of the sprint race, where he went into the gravel and lost four positions, cost him a chance at a higher position, which Alatalo took full blame for and described as having been "quite rubbish". A disappointing round at Zandvoort followed, where the Finn caused a premature end to qualifying after a crash in turn 3, but he would score a best qualifying result of seventh in the final round at Monza, which he called "a good way to end the last qualifying of the season". Alatalo had more points than either his teammates Ido (2 pts) or Malvestiti (0 pts), scoring 24 points and thus finishing 18th in the standings.

Personal life
Alatalo goes to school at Kuortaneen urheilulukio. He was born to an Ethiopian mother and Finnish father.

Karting record

Karting career summary

Complete CIK-FIA Karting European Championship results 
(key) (Races in bold indicate pole position) (Races in italics indicate fastest lap)

Racing record

Racing career summary 

† As he was a guest driver, Alatalo was ineligible to score points.

Complete Formula STCC Nordic results 
(key) (Races in bold indicate pole position) (Races in italics indicate fastest lap)

Complete Italian F4 Championship results 
(key) (Races in bold indicate pole position) (Races in italics indicate fastest lap)

Complete FIA Motorsport Games results

Complete Formula Renault Eurocup results 
(key) (Races in bold indicate pole position) (Races in italics indicate fastest lap)

‡ Half points awarded as less than 75% of race distance was completed.

Complete Formula Regional European Championship results 
(key) (Races in bold indicate pole position) (Races in italics indicate fastest lap)

† As Alatalo was a guest driver, he was ineligible to score points.

Complete FIA Formula 3 Championship results 
(key) (Races in bold indicate pole position; races in italics indicate points for the fastest lap of top ten finishers)

References

External links 
 
 

2002 births
Living people
Finnish racing drivers
Italian F4 Championship drivers
Formula Renault Eurocup drivers
ADAC Formula 4 drivers
Formula Regional European Championship drivers
Mücke Motorsport drivers
JD Motorsport drivers
Arden International drivers
FIA Formula 3 Championship drivers
Jenzer Motorsport drivers
Finnish people of Ethiopian descent
FIA Motorsport Games drivers
KIC Motorsport drivers
Karting World Championship drivers
UAE F4 Championship drivers